Grand Prince Inpyeong (1622–1658) was the third son of Injo of Joseon. After the death of Grand Prince Neungchang, Inpyeong became his adopted son. After his father surrendered to Qing dynasty, Grand Prince Inpyeong was sent to Qing dynasty as a hostage. His 10th generation descendent was Gojong of Korea who becomes the King when Cheoljong of Joseon died without any surviving sons.

Life 
On 10 December 1622 in Lunar calendar, Grand Prince Inpyeong was born as the son of Nungyang-gune, the grandson of Seonjo. He entered the palace after his father became the king by coup in 1623. In 1629, Inpyeong became grand prince. He had his marriage in 1634, age of 12 with Lady Oh who was the daughter of Oh Dan, one of the officials of Injo. After Qing invasion of Joseon, Grand Prince Inpyeong with Crown Prince Sohyeon, and Grand Prince Bongrim were sent to Qing dynasty. Like his brothers, Inpyeong repeated being sent and sent back to Joseon. By this, Inpyeong got great stress, and got serious illness. Visit to Qing of Inqyeong did not ended after the death of Injo of Joseon. During the reign of Hyojong of Joseon, Inpyeong was again sent to Qing as an ambassador. But, the public opinion of Inpyeong was only worsen. Officials argued that Inpyeong is trying to get hospitality by visiting Qing Dynasty a lot. Song Si-yeol was angry how Hyojong was against his father's advice of taking care of Inpyeong but, sending him as an ambassador to the tiger cave(which meant Qing dynasty). In 1858, by the illness that Inpyeong got while visiting Qing dynasty a lot, Inpyeong died on 13 May 1658(Lunar Callander). Hyojong weeped for his dead which made him to stay at Inpyeong's house too long to make his officials to come back to the palace. Hyojong finally came back to the palace.

In Popular Culture
Portrayed by Choi Woo-sung in the TV series Daemyeong.
Portrayed by Ji Eun-sung in the TV series Blooded Palace: The War of Flowers.

References

Korean princes
House of Yi
1622 births
1658 deaths
17th-century Korean people